Freddy Jan Robert Borg (born 27 November 1983) is a Swedish former professional footballer who played as a forward.

Career

Sweden
Borg started his career with Trelleborgs FF as a youth player, before moving to Malmö FF, Höllvikens GIF and then Östers IF, where he spent seven years.

Germany
On 22 January 2012, Borg signed a six-month contract with Hansa Rostock of the German 2. Bundesliga. Borg scored five times in 14 appearances for the club during his stay. June 2012 saw Borg sign for Alemannia Aachen in the 3. Liga. After six months with Alemannia Aachen, Borg signed a six-month contract with SV Darmstadt 98, also of the 3. Liga, in January 2013.

Azerbaijan
In July 2013, Borg signed for Azerbaijan Premier League side AZAL. Borg made his debut on 10 August 2013, coming on as a 65th-minute substitute for Garib Ibrahimov, in their 1–0 victory over Baku.  In December 2013, the start of the winter break in the Azerbaijan season, Borg was released from his contract with AZAL having made just six substitute appearances whilst failing to score.

Return to Sweden
Following his short stint in Azerbaijan, Borg signed for his hometown team Trelleborgs FF on a short-term contract till the summer of 2014, with an option of extending till the end of the season, in March 2014.

Career statistics

References

External links
 
 

1983 births
Living people
People from Trelleborg
Swedish footballers
Footballers from Skåne County
Association football forwards
Allsvenskan players
Superettan players
2. Bundesliga players
3. Liga players
Trelleborgs FF players
Malmö FF players
Östers IF players
FC Hansa Rostock players
Alemannia Aachen players
SV Darmstadt 98 players
Swedish expatriate footballers
Swedish expatriate sportspeople in Germany
Expatriate footballers in Germany
Swedish expatriate sportspeople in Azerbaijan
Expatriate footballers in Azerbaijan
Swedish expatriate sportspeople in Norway
Expatriate footballers in Norway